Port Morris is a historic unincorporated community located within Roxbury Township, in Morris County, New Jersey, United States. Despite its name, Port Morris is in the hills of the Skylands Region, on the shores of Lake Musconetcong.

In the 1820s, George P. Macculloch envisioned a canal that would transport Pennsylvania coal to New York City. The plan was to construct a canal from Phillipsburg, New Jersey at the confluence of the Delaware and Lehigh Rivers, near the coal fields, to Newark, Jersey City or New York City. The section of the Morris Canal was completed to Newark in 1831, and Port Morris become one of the major stops established along the route of the Canal.

With the rise of the railroad came the demise of canals. Despite the changeover in transportation methods, Port Morris found a new role. With the construction of the Lackawanna Cutoff, constructed by the Delaware, Lackawanna and Western Railroad between 1908 and 1911, Port Morris became a major railroad junction and the starting point of the Cutoff.

Demographics

References

External links
AN ILLUSTRATED HISTORY OF PORT MORRIS, NEW JERSEY
The Lackawanna Cutoff - Then & Now: Port Morris and Landing

Roxbury Township, New Jersey
Unincorporated communities in Morris County, New Jersey
Unincorporated communities in New Jersey